3553 Mera, provisional designation , is an Amor asteroid discovered on May 14, 1985, by C. Shoemaker at Palomar. It was named for Maera,  a daughter of Praetus.

References

External links 
 
 
 

003553
Discoveries by Carolyn S. Shoemaker
19850514
Named minor planets